Đinh Hoàng La (born as Mykola Lytovka; Russian: Николай Литовка; born 20 October 1979) is a naturalized Vietnamese retired footballer.

References

Vietnamese footballers
Ukrainian footballers
Association football goalkeepers
Living people
1979 births
Vietnam international footballers
Vissai Ninh Bình FC players
FC Hirnyk Rovenky players
FC Elektrometalurh-NZF Nikopol players
Becamex Binh Duong FC players
V.League 1 players
SC Olkom Melitopol players
FC Nyva Vinnytsia players
FC Knyazha Shchaslyve players
FC Podillya Khmelnytskyi players
FC Nistru Otaci players
Ukrainian expatriate footballers
Expatriate footballers in Vietnam
Naturalized citizens of Vietnam
Footballers from Kyiv